The 2022 Liga Națională de Rugby is the 104th season of the top Romanian rugby union competition operated by the Romanian Rugby Federation.

Teams
Fourteen clubs will compete in the 2022 Liga Națională de Rugby season, nine of them joining the competition from the now defunct Divizia Națională de Seniori, formerly the second division of domestic Romanian rugby, while another five teams join the competition from the also defunct CEC Bank SuperLiga, formerly the first division of domestic Romanian rugby.

Table

Group A

Group B

Playouts

Playoffs

Fixtures & results

Round 1

Round 2

Round 3

Round 4

Round 5

Round 6

Round 7

Playoffs

Round 1

Round 2

Round 3

Round 4

Round 5

Round 6

Finals

Semifinals

3rd place match

Final

References

External links
 

SuperLiga (rugby)
2021–22 in Romanian rugby union
2021–22 in European rugby union leagues